The 2019 FA Vase Final was the 45th final of the Football Association's cup competition for teams at levels 9–11 of the English football league system. The match was contested between Chertsey Town, of the Combined Counties Premier Division, and Cray Valley Paper Mills, of the Southern Counties East Premier Division. This was the first time both teams had reached the final and the first visit to Wembley Stadium for both sides. The final of the FA Trophy was played on the same day at the same venue for the fourth year running, as part of the FA's Non-League Finals Day. Both matches were televised in the UK on BT Sport.

Chertsey Town began their campaign in the first qualifying round, with a victory over Woodley United. They proceeded to defeat Tadley Calleva, Flackwell Heath, Horndean, Redbridge, St. Austell, Irlam and West Auckland Town en route to the semi-final where they faced Northwich Victoria. After a 1–1 draw in the first leg, Chertsey Town drew 0–0 after extra time in the second leg before winning 5–3 on penalties, securing a place in the final.

Cray Valley Paper Mills also began their campaign in the first qualifying round, where they defeated Sutton Athletic. Victories over Hailsham Town, St. Panteleimon, Badshot Lea, Sheppey United, Baffins Milton Rovers, Abbey Rangers and Willand Rovers saw them reach the semi-final where they faced Canterbury City. Cray Valley Paper Mills won the round 2–1 on aggregate after winning the first leg 1–0, and a 1–1 draw in the second leg.

Route to the final

Chertsey Town

Cray Valley Paper Mills

Match

Details

References

2019
FA Vase Final
FA Vase Final 2019
FA Vase Final